Elachista jubarella is a moth species in the family Elachistidae. It was described by Lauri Kaila in 2011. It is found in Russia, where it has been recorded from the western Caucasus. The habitat consists of alpine meadows.

The wingspan is about 12 mm. The forewings are chalky white, with the basal third of the costa narrowly grey. The hindwings are dark grey, with paler yellowish fringe scales.

References

Moths described in 2011
jubarella
Moths of Europe